James Alexander Walker (1831 – 1898), was a British painter of French descent known for his battle scenes.

Biography
He was born in Calcutta, but from 1871 he lived in Paris where he made historical scenes of soldiers.

He died in Paris.

References

James Alexander Walker on Artnet

1831 births
1898 deaths
19th-century English painters
English male painters
Artists from Kolkata
19th-century French painters
French male painters
English people of French descent
19th-century French male artists
19th-century English male artists